Aaron Blanton (born March 6, 1991) is an American producer and director.

Early life 
Blanton grew up in Eugene, Oregon, where he spent high school acting in and directing plays. He attended the University of Oregon, where he majored in Cinema Studies and Journalism.

Career 

As a student at the University of Oregon, Blanton co-produced the anti-rape PSA A Needed Response, which subsequently went viral after being featured on Upworthy.  In 2013, it became the first viral video ever to win a Peabody Award. Blanton then went on to work on The Hunting Ground, and the PBS series Poetry in America with Elisa New.

In 2021, Blanton co-created the audio drama podcast What Happened in Skinner, which is nominated for Best Indie Podcast at the 2022 Ambie Awards. The project also incorporated a short film and an alternate reality game.

References 

1991 births
Living people
American directors
American producers
Peabody Award winners
People from Eugene, Oregon